Chawinroj Likitcharoensakul (name changed from Chawin Likitcharoenpong, nicknamed Fame) is a Thai actor. He was born 17 May 1998. He debuted at age 12 in the 2010 film The Little Comedian (บ้านฉัน..ตลกไว้ก่อน (พ่อสอนไว้)).  He studies at Mattayom6, Srinakharinwirot University Prasarnmit Demonstration School.

Filmography

Movie

TV drama

Recognition 
 Nominated for Top Awards 2010
 Nominated for Kom Chat Luek Award 8

References

External links 
 

Chawinroj Likitcharoensakul
Chawinroj Likitcharoensakul
Chawinroj Likitcharoensakul
Chawinroj Likitcharoensakul
Chawinroj Likitcharoensakul
1998 births
Living people